Stevin L. "Hedake" Smith (born January 24, 1972) is an American former professional basketball player, who is also known for his involvement in the 1994 Arizona State point-shaving scandal.

Early life 
Smith was born in Dallas, Texas, the only son of Eunice Smith. He was an outstanding high school basketball player. He played at Arizona State University under head coach Bill Frieder. His "Hedake" nickname originally came from his mother, who called her rambunctious child "Headache", but had to shorten the spelling for a personalized license plate.

College career 
Stevin “Hedake” Smith played point guard for Arizona State University from 1991 through 1994, and was a two-time All-Pac-10 selection.  However, he also became involved in the 1994 Arizona State point-shaving scandal along with ASU teammate Isaac Burton. Smith would bet on his own games that he was fixing and received $20,000 for shaving points in the game against Oregon State on January 28, 1994. He was arrested in the summer of 1997, and in December 1997, Smith and Burton pleaded guilty to conspiracy charges, admitting taking bribes to fix four games in 1994 Smith was sentenced to one year and one day in prison.

Smith holds the Arizona State career records for most three-point shots attempted and most three-point shots made. He shares the career record for most steals with Fat Lever.

Professional basketball career 
After failing to make an NBA team after leaving college in 1994, Smith took his game overseas, playing for the Spanish team Somontano Huesca during the 1994-95 season. Over the next four years, Smith played for teams in the Philippines, Turkey, France and in the CBA.

During the 1997 NBA season, Smith signed two consecutive 10-day contracts with the Dallas Mavericks, and received his only NBA playing time. He played 60 minutes over eight games, scoring 14 points for a 1.8 per-game average.

After his release from prison in 2000, Smith returned to Europe and his professional basketball career, playing for three different teams based in France from 2001–03, in the Israeli League in 2004 and for Dynamo Moscow in Russia for two seasons until 2006. In 2006-07, Smith joined Legea Scafati of the Italian Serie A league.

Post-playing career
Stevin Smith later became the Vice President of the N.O.W. Program, a mentoring program for young people in the Dallas area.

In popular culture 
Smith is the subject of an episode of the 2021 Netflix documentary series Bad Sport.

References

External links
NBA statistics @ basketball-reference.com

1972 births
Living people
21st-century African-American sportspeople
African-American basketball players
American expatriate basketball people in Bulgaria
American expatriate basketball people in France
American expatriate basketball people in Israel
American expatriate basketball people in Italy
American expatriate basketball people in the Philippines
American expatriate basketball people in Russia
American expatriate basketball people in Spain
American expatriate basketball people in Turkey
American men's basketball players
Arizona State Sun Devils men's basketball players
Basketball players from Dallas
BC Dynamo Moscow players
CB Peñas Huesca players
Dallas Mavericks players
Grand Rapids Mackers players
Ironi Nahariya players
Israeli Basketball Premier League players
Liga ACB players
Olympique Antibes basketball players
PBC Academic players
Philippine Basketball Association imports
Point guards
Pop Cola Panthers players
Scafati Basket players
Sioux Falls Skyforce (CBA) players
SLUC Nancy Basket players
Undrafted National Basketball Association players
20th-century African-American sportspeople